The king of Babylon (Akkadian: , later also ) was the ruler of the ancient Mesopotamian city of Babylon and its kingdom, Babylonia, which existed as an independent realm from the 19th century BC to its fall in the 6th century BC. For the majority of its existence as an independent kingdom, Babylon ruled most of southern Mesopotamia, composed of the ancient regions of Sumer and Akkad. The city experienced two major periods of ascendancy, when Babylonian kings rose to dominate large parts of the Ancient Near East: the First Babylonian Empire (or Old Babylonian Empire,  1894/1880–1595 BC) and the Second Babylonian Empire (or Neo-Babylonian Empire, 626–539 BC). Babylon was ruled by Hammurabi, who created Hammurabi's code.

Many of Babylon's kings were of foreign origin. Throughout the city's nearly two-thousand year history, it was ruled by kings of native Babylonian (Akkadian), Amorite, Kassite, Elamite, Aramean, Assyrian, Chaldean, Persian, Greek and Parthian origin. A king's cultural and ethnic background does not appear to have been important for the Babylonian perception of kingship, the important matter instead being whether the king was capable of executing the duties traditionally ascribed to the Babylonian king: establishing peace and security, upholding justice, honouring civil rights, refraining from unlawful taxation, respecting religious traditions, constructing temples, providing gifts to the gods in the temples and maintaining cultic order. Babylonian revolts of independence during the times the city was ruled by foreign empires probably had little to do with the rulers of these empires not being Babylonians and more to do with the rulers rarely visiting Babylon and failing to partake in the city's rituals and traditions.

Babylon's last native king was Nabonidus, who reigned from 556 to 539 BC. Nabonidus's rule was ended through Babylon being conquered by Cyrus the Great of the Achaemenid Empire. Though early Achaemenid kings continued to place importance on Babylon and continued using the title 'king of Babylon', later Achaemenid rulers being ascribed the title is probably only something done by the Babylonians themselves, with the kings themselves having abandoned it. Babylonian scribes continued to recognise rulers of the empires that controlled Babylonia as their kings until the time of the Parthian Empire, when Babylon was gradually abandoned. Though Babylon never regained independence after the Achaemenid conquest, there were several attempts by the Babylonians to drive out their foreign rulers and re-establish their kingdom, possibly as late as 336/335 BC under the rebel Nidin-Bel.

Introduction

Royal titles 

Throughout the city's long history, various titles were used to designate the ruler of Babylon and its kingdom, the most common titles being 'viceroy of Babylon', 'king of Karduniash' and 'king of Sumer and Akkad'. Use of one of the titles did not mean that the others could not be used simultaneously. For instance, the Neo-Assyrian king Tiglath-Pileser III (729–727 BC in Babylon), used all three of the aforementioned titles.

 Viceroy (or governor) of Babylon – emphasises the political dominion of Babylon itself. For much of the city's history, its rulers referred to themselves as viceroys or governors, rather than kings. The reason for this was that Babylon's true king was formally considered to be its national deity, Marduk. By not explicitly claiming the royal title, Babylonian rulers thus showed reverence to the city's god. The reign of the Neo-Assyrian king Sennacherib (705–681 BC) has been noted as a particular break in this tradition, as he assumed the title king of Babylon, which may have contributed to widespread negative reception of him in Babylonia. Though Sennacherib's successors would primarily use , there are likewise examples of them instead using . The titles would also be used interchangeably by the later Neo-Babylonian kings.
 King of Karduniash – refers to rule of southern Mesopotamia as a whole. 'Karduniash' was the Kassite name for the Babylonian kingdom, and the title 'king of Karduniash' was introduced by the city's third dynasty (the Kassites). The title continued to be used long after the Kassites had lost control of Babylon, for instance as late as under the native king Nabu-shuma-ukin I ( 900–888 BC) and the Neo-Assyrian king Esarhaddon (681–669 BC).
 King of Sumer and Akkad – refers to rule of southern Mesopotamia as a whole. A title originally used by the kings of the Third Dynasty of Ur ( 2112–2004 BC), centuries prior to Babylon's foundation. The title was used by kings to connect themselves to the culture and legacy of the Sumerian and Akkadian civilizations, as well as to lay claim to the political hegemony achieved during the ancient Akkadian Empire. The title was also a geographical one, in that southern Mesopotamia was typically divided into the two regions Sumer (the south) and Akkad (the north), meaning that 'king of Sumer and Akkad' referred to rulership over the entire country. The title was used by the Babylonian kings until the end of the Neo-Babylonian Empire in 539 BC, and was also assumed by Cyrus the Great, who conquered Babylon and ruled Babylonia until his death in 530 BC.

Role and legitimacy 
The Babylonian kings derived their right to rule from divine appointment by Babylon's patron deity Marduk and through consecration by the city's priests. Marduk's main cult image (often conflated with the god himself), the statue of Marduk, was prominently used in the coronation rituals for the kings, who received their crowns "out of the hands" of Marduk during the New Year's festival, symbolizing them being bestowed with kingship by the deity. The king's rule and his role as Marduk's vassal on Earth were reaffirmed annually at this time of year, when the king entered the Esagila, Babylon's main cult temple, alone on the fifth day of the New Year's Festival each year and met with the high priest. The high priest removed the regalia from the king, slapped him across the face and made him kneel before Marduk's statue. The king would then tell the statue that he had not oppressed his people and that he had maintained order throughout the year, whereafter the high priest would reply (on behalf of Marduk) that the king could continue to enjoy divine support for his rule, returning the royal regalia. Through being a patron of Babylon's temples, the king extended his generosity towards the Mesopotamian gods, who in turn empowered his rule and lent him their authority.

Babylonian kings were expected to establish peace and security, uphold justice, honor civil rights, refrain from unlawful taxation, respect religious traditions and maintain cultic order. None of the king's responsibilities and duties required him to be ethnically or even culturally Babylonian. Any foreigner sufficiently familiar with the royal customs of Babylonia could adopt the title, though they might then require the assistance of the native priesthood and the native scribes. Ethnicity and culture does not appear to have been important in the Babylonian perception of kingship: many foreign kings enjoyed support from the Babylonians and several native kings were despised. That the rule of some foreign kings was not supported by the Babylonians probably has little to do with their ethnic or cultural background, but rather that they were perceived as not properly executing the traditional duties of the Babylonian king.

Dynasties 

As with other monarchies, the kings of Babylon are grouped into a series of royal dynasties, a practice started by the ancient Babylonians themselves in their king lists. The generally accepted Babylonian dynasties should not be understood as familial groupings in the same vein as the term is commonly used by historians for ruling families in later kingdoms and empires. Though Babylon's first dynasty did form a dynastic grouping where all monarchs were related, the dynasties of the first millennium BC, notably the Dynasty of E, did not constitute a series of coherent familial relationships at all. In some cases, kings known to be genealogically related, such as Eriba-Marduk ( 769–760 BC) and his grandson Marduk-apla-iddina II (722–710 BC and 703 BC), were separated into different dynasties, the former designated as belonging to the Dynasty of E and the latter as belonging to the (Third) Sealand dynasty.

Sources 

Among all the different types of documents uncovered through excavations in Mesopotamia, the most important for reconstructions of chronology and political history are king-lists and chronicles, grouped together under the term 'chronographic texts'. Mesopotamian king lists are of special importance when reconstructing the sequences of monarchs, as they are collections of royal names and regnal dates, also often with additional information such as the relations between the kings, arranged in a table format. In terms of Babylonian rulers, the main document is the Babylonian King List (BKL), a group of three independent documents: Babylonian King List A, B, and C. In addition to the main Babylonian King Lists, there are also additional king-lists that record rulers of Babylon.
 Babylonian King List A (BKLa, BM 33332) — created at some point after the foundation of the Neo-Babylonian Empire, Babylonian King List A records the kings of Babylon from the beginning of Babylon's first dynasty under Sumu-abum ( 1894–1881 BC) to Kandalanu (648–627 BC). The end of the tablet is broken off, suggesting that it originally listed rulers after Kandalanu as well, possibly also listing the kings of the Neo-Babylonian Empire. All dynasties are separated by horizontal lines, under which subscript records a sum of the regnal years of each dynasty, and the number of kings the dynasties produced. Written in Neo-Babylonian script.
Babylonian King List B (BKLb, BM 38122) — date of origin uncertain, written in Neo-Babylonian script. Babylonian King List B records the kings of Babylon's first dynasty, and the kings of the First Sealand dynasty, with subscripts recording the number of kings and their summed up reigns in these dynasties. Regnal years are recorded for the kings of the first dynasty, but omitted for the kings of the Sealand dynasty. The regnal years used for the kings are inconsistent with their actual reign lengths, possibly due to the author having copied the list from a document where the years had been lost or damaged. The list records genealogical information for all but two of the kings of the first dynasty, but only for two of the kings of the Sealand dynasty. Because the document is essentially two lists for two dynasties, it is possible that it was copied and extracted from longer king lists in the late period for some unknown purpose.
Babylonian King List C (BKLc) — a short text, written in Neo-Babylonian script. King List C is important as a source on the second dynasty of Isin, as the first seven lines of the preserved nine lines of text provide a portion of the sequence of kings of this dynasty and their dates. The corresponding section in Babylonian King List A is incompletely preserved. As the list ends with the Isin dynasty's seventh king, Marduk-shapik-zeri ( 1081–1069 BC), it is possible that it was written during the reign of his successor, Adad-apla-iddina ( 1068–1047 BC). Its short length and unusual shape (being curved rather than flat) means that it might have been a practice tablet used by a young Babylonian student.
Synchronistic King List (ScKL) — a collection of individual tablets and examplars. The Synchronistic King List features two columns, and records the kings of Babylon and Assyria together, with kings recorded next to each other presumably being contemporaries. Unlike most of the other documents, this list generally omits regnal years and any genealogical information, but it also differs in including many of the chief scribes under the Assyrian and Babylonian kings. The tablet with the earliest known portion of the list begins with the Assyrian king Erishum I (uncertain regnal dates) and the Babylonian king Sumu-la-El ( 1880–1845 BC). The latest known portion ends with Ashur-etil-ilani (631–627 BC) in Assyria and Kandalanu in Babylon. As it is written in Neo-Assyrian script, it might have been created near the end of the Neo-Assyrian Empire.
Uruk King List (UKL, IM 65066) — the preserved portion of this king list records rulers from Kandalanu in the Assyrian period to Seleucus II Callinicus (246–225 BC) in the Seleucid period.
Babylonian King List of the Hellenistic Period (BM 35603) — written at Babylon at some point after 141 BC, recording rulers from the start of Hellenistic rule in Babylonia under Alexander the Great (331–323 in Babylon), to the end of Seleucid rule under Demetrius II Nicator (145–141 BC in Babylon) and the conquest of Babylonia by the Parthian Empire. Entries before Seleucus I Nicator (305–281 BC) and after Antiochus IV Epiphanes (175–164 BC) are damaged and fragmentary.
As years in Babylon were named after the current king, and the current year of their reign, date formulas in economic, astronomical and literary cuneiform texts written in Babylonia also provide highly important and useful chronological data.

Kingship after the Neo-Babylonian Empire 

In addition to the king lists described above, cuneiform inscriptions and tablets confidently establish that the Babylonians continued to recognise the foreign rulers of Babylonia as their legitimate monarchs after the fall of the Neo-Babylonian Empire and throughout the rule of the Achaemenid (539–331 BC), Argead (331–310 BC), and Seleucid (305–141 BC) empires, as well as well into the rule of the Parthian Empire (141 BC – AD 224).

Early Achaemenid kings greatly respected Babylonian culture and history, and regarded Babylonia as a separate entity or kingdom united with their own kingdom in something akin to a personal union. Despite this, the Babylonians would grow to resent Achaemenid rule, just as they had resented Assyrian rule during the time their country was under the rule of the Neo-Assyrian Empire (722–626 BC). Babylonian resentment of the Achaemenids likely had little to do with the Achaemenids being foreigners, but rather that the Achaemenid kings were perceived to not be capable of executing the duties of the Babylonian king properly, in line with established Babylonian tradition. This perception then led to frequent Babylonian revolts, an issue experienced by both the Assyrians and the Achaemenids. Since the capitals of the Assyrian and Achaemenid empires were elsewhere, these foreign kings did not regularly partake in the city's rituals (meaning that they could not be celebrated in the same way that they traditionally were) and they rarely performed their traditional duties to the Babylonian cults through constructing temples and presenting cultic gifts to the city's gods. This failure might have been interpreted as the kings thus not having the necessary divine endorsement to be considered true kings of Babylon.

The standard regnal title used by the early Achaemenid kings, not only in Babylon but throughout their empire, was 'king of Babylon and king of the lands'. The Babylonian title was gradually abandoned by the Achaemenid king Xerxes I (486–465 BC), after he had to put down a major Babylonian uprising. Xerxes also divided the previously large Babylonian satrapy into smaller sub-units and, according to some sources, damaged the city itself in an act of retribution. The last Achaemenid king whose own royal inscriptions officially used the title 'king of Babylon' was Xerxes I's son and successor Artaxerxes I (465–424 BC). After Artaxerxes I's rule there are few examples of monarchs themselves using the title, though the Babylonians continued to ascribe it to their rulers. The only known official explicit use of 'king of Babylon' by a king during the Seleucid period can be found in the Antiochus cylinder, a clay cylinder containing a text wherein Antiochus I Soter (281–261 BC) calls himself, and his father Seleucus I Nicator (305–281 BC), by the title 'king of Babylon', alongside various other ancient Mesopotamian titles and honorifics. The Seleucid kings continued to respect Babylonian traditions and culture, with several Seleucid kings recorded as having "given gifts to Marduk" in Babylon and the New Year's Festival still being recorded as a contemporary event. One of the last times the festival is known to have been celebrated was in 188 BC, under the Seleucid king Antiochus III (222–187 BC), who prominently partook in the rituals. From the Hellenistic period (i. e. the rule of the Greek Argeads and Seleucids) onwards, Greek culture became established in Babylonia, but per Oelsner (2014), the Hellenistic culture "did not deeply penetrate the ancient Babylonian culture, that persisted to exist in certain domains and areas until the 2nd c. AD".

Under the Parthian Empire, Babylon was gradually abandoned as a major urban centre and the old Babylonian culture diminished. The nearby and newer imperial capitals cities of Seleucia and later Ctesiphon overshadowed the ancient city and became the seats of power in the region. Babylon was still important in the first century or so of Parthian rule, and cuneiform tablets continued to recognise the rule of the Parthian kings. The standard title formula applied to the Parthian kings in Babylonian documents was " " ("Arsaces, king of kings"). Several tablets from the Parthian period also in their date formulae mention the queen of the incumbent Parthian king, alongside the king, the first time women were officially recognised as monarchs of Babylon. The few documents that survive from Babylon in the Parthian period indicate a growing sense of alarm and alienation in Babylon as the Parthian kings were mostly absent from the city and the Babylonians noticed their culture slowly slipping away.

When exactly Babylon was abandoned is unclear. The Roman author Pliny the Elder wrote in AD 50 that proximity to Seleucia had turned Babylon into a "barren waste" and during their campaigns in the east, Roman emperors Trajan (in AD 115) and Septimius Severus (in AD 199) supposedly found the city destroyed and deserted. Archaeological evidence and the writings of Abba Arikha ( AD 219) indicate that at least the temples of Babylon may still have been active in the early 3rd century. If any remnants of the old Babylonian culture still existed at that point, they would have been decisively wiped out as the result of religious reforms in the early Sasanian Empire  AD 230.

Due to a shortage of sources, and the timing of Babylon's abandonment being unknown, the last ruler recognised by the Babylonians as king is not known. The latest known cuneiform tablet is W22340a, found at Uruk and dated to AD 79/80. The tablet preserves the word  (king), indicating that the Babylonians by this point still recognised a king. At this time, Babylonia was ruled by the Parthian rival king (i. e. usurper) Artabanus III. Modern historians are divided on where the line of monarchs ends. Spar and Lambert (2005) did not include any rulers beyond the first century AD in their list of kings recognised by the Babylonians, but Beaulieu (2018) considered 'Dynasty XIV of Babylon' (his designation for the Parthians as rulers of the city) to have lasted until the end of Parthian rule of Babylonia in the early 3rd century AD.

Names in cuneiform 
The list below includes the names of all the kings in Akkadian, as well as how the Akkadian names were rendered in cuneiform signs. Up until the reign of Burnaburiash II ( 1359–1333 BC) of the Kassite dynasty (Dynasty III), Sumerian was the dominant language for use in inscriptions and official documents, with Akkadian eclipsing it under the reign of Kurigalzu II ( 1332–1308 BC), and thereafter replacing Sumerian in inscriptions and documents. For consistency purposes, and because several kings and their names are known only from king lists, which were written in Akkadian centuries after Burnaburiash II's reign, this list solely uses Akkadian, rather than Sumerian, for the royal names, though this is anachronistic for rulers before Burnaburiash II.

It is not uncommon for there to be several different spellings of the same name in Akkadian, even when referring to the same individual. To examplify this, the table below presents two ways the name of Nebuchadnezzar II (605–562 BC) was spelt in Akkadian. The list of kings below uses more concise spellings when possible, primarily based on the renditions of names in date formulae and king lists.

Even if the same spelling is used, there were also several different scripts of cuneiform signs: a name, even if spelt the same, looks considerably different in Old Babylonian signs compared to Neo-Babylonian signs or Neo-Assyrian signs. The table below presents different variants, depending on the signs used, of the name Antiochus in Akkadian. The list of kings below uses Neo-Babylonian and Neo-Assyrian signs, given that those scripts are the signs primarily used in the king lists.

Dynasty I (Amorite), 1894–1595 BC 

Per BKLb, the native name for this dynasty was simply  ('dynasty of Babylon'). To differentiate it from the other dynasties that later ruled Babylon, modern historians often refer to this dynasty as the 'First Dynasty of Babylon'. Some historians refer to this dynasty as the 'Amorite dynasty' on account of the kings being of Amorite descent. While the king list gives a regnal length of 31 years for the final king, Samsu-Ditana, the destruction layer at Babylon is dated to his 26th year and no later sources have been found.

{| class="wikitable" style="width:100%; text-align:center;"
! width="20%" |King
! width="20%" | Akkadian
! width="10%" |Reigned from
! width="10%" |Reigned until
! width="40%" |Succession
! width="10%" |Ref
|-
|Sumu-abum{{Efn|Sumu-abum was the first king of Babylon according to Babylonian King Lists A and B. There is no contemporary evidence for his rule in Babylon; the earliest ruler who there is textual evidence of in Babylon itself is Sin-Muballit, the fifth king according to the king lists. Sumu-abum is contemporarily attested as a ruler of the cities Dilbat, Sippar and Kisurra, but some evidence seems to suggest that he and Sumu-la-El (his supposed successor) were contemporaries. Later rulers of Babylon's first dynasty referred to Sumu-la-El, rather than Sumu-abum, as the founder of their dynasty. It is possible that Sumu-abum did not rule Babylon, but for some reason was inserted in later traditions into the city's dynastic history. Perhaps Sumu-la-El ruled Babylon as a vassal of Sumu-abum, who might have ruled a larger group of territories.|name=Sumu-abum}}
|
| 1894 BC
| 1881 BC
|First king of Babylon in BKLa and BKLb
|
|-
|Sumu-la-El
|
| 1880 BC
| 1845 BC
|Unclear succession
|
|-
|Sabium
|
| 1844 BC
| 1831 BC
|Son of Sumu-la-El
|
|-
|Apil-Sin
|
| 1830 BC
| 1813 BC
|Son of Sabium
|
|-
|Sin-Muballit
|
| 1812 BC
| 1793 BC
|Son of Apil-Sin
|
|-
|Hammurabi
|
| 1792 BC
| 1750 BC
|Son of Sin-Muballit
|
|-
|Samsu-iluna
|
| 1749 BC
| 1712 BC
|Son of Hammurabi
|
|-
|Abi-Eshuh
|
| 1711 BC
| 1684 BC
|Son of Samsu-iluna
|
|-
|Ammi-Ditana
|
| 1683 BC
| 1647 BC
|Son of Abi-Eshuh
|
|-
|Ammi-Saduqa
|
| 1646 BC
| 1626 BC
|Son of Ammi-Ditana
|
|-
|Samsu-Ditana
|
| 1625 BC
| 1595 BC
|Son of Ammi-Saduqa
|
|}

Dynasty II (1st Sealand), 1725–1475 BC 

Presumably, the city of Urukug was the dynasty's point of origin. Some literary sources refer to some of the kings of this dynasty as 'kings of the Sealand', and thus modern historians refer to it as a dynasty of the Sealand. The designation as the first Sealand dynasty differentiates it from Dynasty V, which the Babylonians actually referred to as a 'dynasty of the Sealand'. This dynasty overlaps with Dynasty I and Dynasty III, with these kings actually ruling the region south of Babylon (the Sealand) rather than Babylon itself. For instance, the king Gulkishar of this dynasty was actually a contemporary of Dynasty I's last king, Samsu-Ditana. It is possible that the dynasty was included in Babylon's dynastic history by later scribes either because it controlled Babylon for a time, because it controlled or strongly influenced parts of Babylonia or because it was the most stable power of its time in Babylonia. The dates listed below are highly uncertain, and follow the timespan listed for the dynasty in Beaulieu (2018),  1725–1475 BC, with the individual dates based the lengths of the reigns of the kings, also as given by Beaulieu (2018).

Dynasty III (Kassite), 1729–1155 BC 

The reconstruction of the sequence and names of the early rulers of this dyansty, the kings before Karaindash, is difficult and controversial. The king lists are damaged at this point and the preserved portions seem to contradict each other: for instance, BKLa has a king in-between Kashtiliash I and Abi-Rattash, omitted in the Synchronistic King List, whereas the Synchronistic King List includes Kashtiliash II, omitted in BKLa, between Abi-Rattash and Urzigurumash. It also seems probable that the earliest kings ascribed to this dynasty in king lists did not actually rule Babylon, but were added as they were ancestors of the later rulers. Babylonia was not fully consolidated and reunified until the reign of Ulamburiash, who defeated Ea-gamil, the last king of the first Sealand dynasty.

Dynasty IV (2nd Isin), 1153–1022 BC 
Presumably, the city of Isin was the dynasty's point of origin. Modern historians refer to this dynasty as the second dynasty of Isin to differentiate it from the ancient Sumerian dynasty of Isin. Previous scholarship assumed that the first king of this dynasty, Marduk-kabit-ahheshu, ruled for the first years of his reign concurrently with the last Kassite king, but recent research suggests that this was not the case. This list follows the revised chronology of the kings of this dynasty, per Beaulieu (2018), which also means revising the dates of subsequent dynasties.

Dynasty V (2nd Sealand), 1021–1001 BC 
Modern historians call it the second Sealand dynasty in order to distinguish it from Dynasty II.

Dynasty VI (Bazi), 1000–981 BC 
The Bit-Bazi were a clan attested already in the Kassite period. It is likely that the dynasty derives its name either from the city of Baz, or from descent from Bazi, the legendary founder of that city.

Dynasty VII (Elamite), 980–975 BC 
BKLa dynastically separates Mar-biti-apla-usur from other kings with horizontal lines, marking him as belonging to a dynasty of his own.

Dynasty VIII (E), 974–732 BC 
The meaning of 'E' is not clear, but it is likely a reference to the city of Babylon, meaning that the name should be interpreted as 'dynasty of Babylon'. The time of the dynasty of E was a time of great instability and the unrelated kings grouped together under this dynasty even belonged to completely different ethnic groups. Another Babylonian historical work, the Dynastic Chronicle (though it is preserved only fragmentarily), breaks this dynasty up into a succession of brief, smaller, dynasties.

: Babylonian King List A records the names of 17 kings of the dynasty of E, but it states afterwards that the dynasty comprised 22 kings. The discrepancy might be explainable as a scribal error, but it is also possible that there were further kings in the sequence. The list is broken at critical points, and it is possible that five additional kings, whose names thus do not survive, could be inserted between the end of the Babylonian interregnum and the reign of Ninurta-apla-X. Lists of Babylonian rulers by modern historians tend to list Ninurta-apla-X as the first king to rule after Baba-aha-iddina's deposition.

Dynasty IX (Assyrian), 732–626 BC 
'Dynasty IX' is used to, broadly speaking, refer to the rulers of Babylonia during the time it was ruled by the Neo-Assyrian Empire, including Assyrian kings of both the Adaside dynasty and the subsequent Sargonid dynasty, as well as various non-dynastic vassal and rebel kings. They are often grouped together as a dynasty by modern scholars as BKLa does not use lines to separate the rulers, used elsewhere in the list to separate dynasties. BKLa also assigns individual dynastic labels to some of the kings, though thus not in the same fashion as is done for the more concrete earlier dynasties. The  designation associated with each king (they are recorded in the list up until Mushezib-Marduk) is included in the table below and follows Fales (2014).

Dynasty X (Chaldean), 626–539 BC 

The native name for this dynasty does not appear in any sources, as the kings of Dynasty X are only listed in king lists made during the Hellenistic period, when the concept of dynasties ceased being used by Babylonians chronographers to describe Babylonian history. Modern historians typically refer to the dynasty as the 'Neo-Babylonian dynasty', as these kings ruled the Neo-Babylonian Empire, or the 'Chaldean dynasty', after the presumed ethnic origin of the royal line. The Dynastic Chronicle, a later document, refers to Nabonidus as the founder and only king of the 'dynasty of Harran', and may also indicate a dynastic change with Neriglissar's accession, but much of the text is fragmentary.

Babylon under foreign rule, 539 BC – AD 224 
The concept of dynasties ceased being used in king-lists made after the fall of the Neo-Babylonian Empire, meaning that the native Babylonian designations for the ruling dynasties of the foreign empires that succeeded the Chaldean kings are unknown.

Dynasty XI (Achaemenid), 539–331 BC

Dynasty XII (Argead), 331–305 BC

Dynasty XIII (Seleucid), 305–141 BC

Dynasty XIV (Arsacid), 141 BC – AD 224 

: The chronology of the Parthian kings, especially in the early period, is disputed on account of a lack of sources. The chronology here, which omits several rival kings and usurpers, primarily follows Shayegan (2011), Dąbrowa (2012) and Daryaee (2012). For alternate interpretations, see the List of Parthian monarchs.

See also 
 List of Assyrian kings – for the Assyrian kings
 List of Mesopotamian dynasties – for other dynasties and kingdoms in ancient Mesopotamia

Notes

References

Bibliography

Web sources 

 

 

 
Babylonia
Babylon
Iraq-related lists